Anton Cosmo Also known as Adom, was born Anthony Migliaccio and is an American composer, Singer, multi-instrumentalist, producer, and engineer.

Cosmo made his live debut with Boston at the 2002 Fiesta Bowl and followed with a back to back tour in 2003 and 2004 headlining as one of Boston's newest member and  guitarist His writing credits include three songs placed on Boston's album Corporate America (Artemis Records) that reached number 46 on Billboard's top 100. His song "Turn It Off" was featured in a national campaign that kicked off Launch.com (Yahoo!) in 2003.

In 2006 Cosmo wrote and produced the debut album Alien for the band Cosmo on Frontiers Records, which featured his father Fran Cosmo on vocals.

Early in 2011 Cosmo became the spokesmodel and the face of Famous Vodka. Cosmo released his solo debut album, was honored as best in class at F.Y.E., and featured on WKTV Live for his debut signing.

Discography

With Boston
 Corporate America (2002)

Cosmo
 Alien (2006)
1 Communication
2 Don't Tell Me Your Lies
3 No Surprise
4 Gravity
5 Redemption
6 Helicopter
7 Alien
8 When I Close My Eyes
9 Woman
10 Can't Run Away
11 Creep
European Bonus Track
12 Don't Tell Me Your Lies (Acoustic Version)
Japanese Bonus Track
12 Clap Your Hands

Solo
 The In Between (2010)
1 Hero
2 In Between
3 Chemicals
4 Universe
5 Humans
6 Say Goodbye
7 Places
8 Grace Of An Angel
9 Closer To Heaven
10 Troubled Minds
11 Fallin Into You
12 Will I Remember
13 Cry
14 Storm

References

External links
 Official Adom Site
 Official Boston Site
 Official IMDB Site

1982 births
Living people
Musicians from New York City
American rock singers
Boston (band) members
21st-century American singers
American people of Italian descent